Riccardo Baroni (born 19 September 1998) is an Italian professional footballer who plays as a defender for  club Pontedera on loan from Modena.

Club career
On 27 July 2017, he joined Lucchese on loan. Baroni made his Serie C debut with the club on 27 August 2017 in a game against Robur Siena.

On 17 August 2019, he signed with Serie A club Fiorentina. On 2 September 2019, he was loaned to Siena.

On 2 October 2020 he joined Serie B side Frosinone. He missed most of the season with an injury and did make his Serie B debut.

On 2 July 2021, he signed a three-year contract with Modena. On 28 July 2022, Baroni was loaned to Pontedera.

Personal life
He is the son of manager and former player Marco Baroni.

Honours

Club 
Virtus Entella
 Serie C: 2018–19 Group A

References

External links
 
 

1998 births
Living people
Footballers from Florence
Italian footballers
Association football defenders
Serie C players
ACF Fiorentina players
S.S.D. Lucchese 1905 players
Virtus Entella players
A.C.N. Siena 1904 players
Frosinone Calcio players
Modena F.C. players
U.S. Città di Pontedera players
Italy youth international footballers